Kaydee were a four-piece pop rock band from Kilkenny, Ireland

Kaydee may also refer to:
 Kaydee, Alberta in Yellowhead County
 Kaydee "Caine" Lawson, a fictional character in the film Menace II Society
 Kay-Dee, record label run by Keb Darge and Kenny Dope
 Kaydee, a rapper and percussionist on Donna Summer's album Mistaken Identity
 Kappa Delta, sorority

See also 
 Caydee Denney (born 1993), American pair figure skater
 KD (disambiguation)
 K-Dee (born 1969), American rapper
 KDEE-LP, radio station
 Kaede (disambiguation)